Entertainment is an American post-punk band founded in 2002 in Athens, Georgia.

History 
Entertainment formed in 2002 in Athens, Georgia, influenced by the Doors, Love, Led Zeppelin, Bauhaus, Public Image Ltd, the Cure, Gang of Four, Christian Death, Joy Division, the Birthday Party, dub and krautrock.

After the December 2003 release of their first single "Safe at One" on Atlanta label Stickfigure Records, the band was signed by now-defunct Luminal Records, who released their second single, "Patroness", in 2004. A split 12-inch EP release with Canadian band A Spectre Is Haunting Europe followed in 2006 on Simulacre Media/Adistant Sound.<ref>{{Cite web|url=https://www.discogs.com/A-Spectre-Is-Haunting-Europe-eNTERTAINMEnt-12-Split/release/2011716|title=A Spectre Is Haunting Europe / eNTERTAINME.nt - 12 Split|website=Discogs.com|accessdate=24 November 2020}}</ref>

Entertainment's debut album, Gender, was released in 2008 by Stickfigure, with a remastered vinyl version issued the following year on New York label Duchess Archive. It received extensive critical acclaim and was voted the 2008 deathrock album of the year by Deathrock.com., who said, "Entertainment take [the] dark, post-punk, gothic concept back to the drawing board, removing the complication and dispensing with the miserable pop-sensibilities of the latest crop of 'post-punk' bandwagoners over the past half decade. What they achieve with surrealistic, visually descriptive lyrics, and the opium-den like pace is ultimately parallel to none other than Only Theatre of Pain, oddly enough". In a 2009 live review for Shadowtime NYC, Big Takeover critic Kristin Sollee described Entertainment as: "A slow burn of anarchic pleasures moving between pounding, tribal vigor and creeping, Gothic slither, few bands can make music this cold and abyssal so fiery and enticing".

In 2016, the band toured the United States as support for Modern English.

Members
 Trey Ehart - vocals, keyboards, guitar 
 Jennifer von Schlichten - bass
 Henry Jack Buxbaum - guitar
 Jim Groff - synth
 Bari Donavan Watts - drums, percussion

Former members
 Andrew Gleason - bass
 Todd Caras - guitar, bass
 Chisolm Thompson - guitar
 Spencer McGhin - guitar
 Kimberley Saint Thomas - bass

Discography
Studio albums
 Gender (2008, Stickfigure Records/Adistant Sound; 2009, Duchess Archive)

Singles
"Safe at One"/"The Queen's Beasts (Or Suffer Fools)" (2003, Stickfigure Records)
"Patroness"/"The Cold Fraction" (2005, Luminal Records)

EPsA Spectre Is Haunting Europe/Entertainment split vinyl 12" with A Spectre Is Haunting Europe (2006,  Simulacre Media/Adistant Sound)

Compilations
 "A Matter of Gender" Outtakes and Demos (2008, Duchess Archive/Adistant Sound)

Compilation appearances
"Shadow and Shadow" on Dots to Connect: The Music of the Prids (2009, Five03 Records)
"Distance" on SOM▲ – A Disaro Mixed Tape'' (2011, Disaro Records)

References

External links
Entertainment on Bandcamp
Entertainment on MySpace
Entertainment on Facebook
Stickfigure Records

American gothic rock groups
American post-punk music groups
Musical groups established in 2006
Indie rock musical groups from Georgia (U.S. state)
American musical trios
Post-punk revival music groups